Kamala Nehru Inter College (Kamala Nehru Inter College, Hindi: कमला नेहरु इण्टर कालेज,बछुआपार,राजेसुल्तानपुर) is an intermediate college located in Rajesultanpur, Uttar Pradesh.It was established in 1999 by the Government of India.

References

External links
 Education Boards in India
 Board of High School and Intermediate Education Uttar Pradesh

Intermediate colleges in Uttar Pradesh
Education in Ambedkar Nagar district
Rajesultanpur
Educational institutions established in 1999
1999 establishments in Uttar Pradesh